Clupeonella is a genus of fish in the family Clupeidae. They are widespread in the fresh and brackish waters of the Caspian Sea and Black drainages.

Species
 Clupeonella abrau (Maliatsky, 1930) (Abrau sprat)
 Clupeonella caspia Svetovidov, 1941 (Caspian tyulka)
 Clupeonella cultriventris (Nordmann, 1840) (Black Sea sprat)
 Clupeonella engrauliformis (Borodin, 1904) (Anchovy sprat)
 Clupeonella grimmi Kessler, 1877 (Southern Caspian sprat)
 Clupeonella muhlisi Neu, 1934
 Clupeonella tscharchalensis (Borodin, 1896) (Freshwater tyulka)

Sources
 

 
Clupeidae
Freshwater fish genera
Taxa named by Karl Kessler
Taxonomy articles created by Polbot